Thomas Gibson was a Scottish professional footballer who made over 180 appearances as a full back in the Football League for Nottingham Forest and captained the club. He also played in the Scottish League for Heart of Midlothian and Morton.

Personal life 
Gibson served as a company sergeant major in the 1st Football Battalion of the Middlesex Regiment during the First World War and held the rank of warrant officer class II. He was partially buried by a shell explosion on the Somme and developed shell shock.

Career statistics

References 

English Football League players
Association football forwards
Nottingham Forest F.C. players
1888 births
Year of death missing
Footballers from Dumfries
Scottish footballers
Association football fullbacks
Scottish Football League players
Greenock Morton F.C. players
Heart of Midlothian F.C. players
Notts County F.C. players
Southend United F.C. players
British Army personnel of World War I
Middlesex Regiment soldiers
Scottish military personnel